Yang Lina (born 13 April 1994) is a Chinese professional footballer who plays as a midfielder for Liga F club Levante Las Planas, on loan from Chinese Women's Super League club Shanghai Shengli, and the China national team.

Club career
On 13 September 2022, Yang joined French club Paris Saint-Germain on a season long loan deal.

Lina had her debut for Levante Las Planas on Feb 4th, 2023. Levante Las Planas drew 0-0 with Alhama in a Liga_F league match.

International career
Yang made her debut for the China national team on 17 August 2018 in a 7–0 Asian Games win against Hong Kong. On 6 October 2018, she scored her first goal in a 2–1 friendly win against Finland. In July 2021, she was named in the squad for the 2020 Olympics.

In January 2022, Yang was named in the squad for the 2022 AFC Women's Asian Cup. She played four matches in the tournament as China went on to win their ninth continental title.

Career statistics

Club

International

Scores and results list China's goal tally first, score column indicates score after each Yang goal.

Honours
China
 Asian Games silver medal: 2018
 AFC Women's Asian Cup: 2022
 EAFF E-1 Championship runner-up: 2022

References

External links
 

1994 births
Living people
Women's association football midfielders
Chinese women's footballers
China women's international footballers
Footballers at the 2020 Summer Olympics
Olympic footballers of China
Asian Games medalists in football
Paris Saint-Germain Féminine players
Chinese Women's Super League players
Division 1 Féminine players
Primera División (women) players
Chinese expatriate sportspeople in France
Chinese expatriate sportspeople in Spain
Expatriate women's footballers in France
Expatriate women's footballers in Spain